Krantz cake  is an Ashkenazi Jewish cake prepared using yeast-risen dough. It has been described as the "most popular cake in the west side of Jerusalem," and as potentially being the most popular cake in all of Israel.

See also
 Babka (cake)
 List of cakes
 List of Israeli dishes

References

Israeli desserts
Sweet breads
Cakes
Ashkenazi Jewish cuisine